Happy Valley is a southern suburb of Wellington, New Zealand, although it is not an "official" suburb to the Wellington City Council. It is a main thoroughfare between Wellington city and Wellington's somewhat rugged and scenic southern coast.

The statistical area of Happy Valley-Owhiro Bay had a population of 1,743 at the 2013 New Zealand census, an increase of 84 people since the 2006 census. There were 858 males and 885 females.

Happy Valley currently has a small eclectic Green community. There is an active community garden nearby the main waterway, the Owhiro Stream, between the school and the coast. North Happy Valley has an active environmental care group called Friends of the Owhiro Stream (FOOS), who have done quite an amount of eco-renewal.

Happy Valley features in the opening and closing scenes of the World War II novel 'Lancewood', written by Alan Marshall, in which both penguins and cows are represented side by side on the beach.

References

Suburbs of Wellington City